Károly Wieland (Hungary, 1 May 1934 – 30 May 2020) was a Hungarian sprint canoeist who competed in the mid to late 1950s. At the 1956 Summer Olympics in Melbourne, he won a bronze medal in the C-2 1000 m event.

Wieland also won a gold in the C-2 10000 m event at the 1954 ICF Canoe Sprint World Championships in Mâcon. He died at his home in Germany on 30 May 2020.

References

Sources
 
 
 

1934 births
2020 deaths
Canoeists at the 1956 Summer Olympics
Hungarian male canoeists
Olympic canoeists of Hungary
Olympic bronze medalists for Hungary
Olympic medalists in canoeing
ICF Canoe Sprint World Championships medalists in Canadian
Medalists at the 1956 Summer Olympics
20th-century Hungarian people